Gordon Green may refer to:
Gordon Green (figure skater) (born 2001), American ice dancer
Gordon Green (footballer, born 1890) (1890–1973), Australian rules footballer
Gordon Green (footballer, born 1925), Australian rules footballer
Gordon Green (pianist), OBE (1905-1981), British pianist and pedagogue